A Lady's Profession is a 1933 American pre-Code comedy film directed by Norman Z. McLeod and written by Malcolm Stuart Boylan, Walter DeLeon and Nina Wilcox Putnam. The film stars Alison Skipworth, Roland Young, Sari Maritza, Kent Taylor, Roscoe Karns, Warren Hymer and George Barbier. The film was released on March 3, 1933, by Paramount Pictures.

Cast 
Alison Skipworth as Beulah Bonnell
Roland Young as Lord Reginald Withers
Sari Maritza as Cecily Withers
Kent Taylor as Dick Garfield
Roscoe Karns as Tony
Warren Hymer as Nutty Bolton
George Barbier as James Garfield
DeWitt Jennings as Mr. Stephens
Billy Bletcher as Keyhole 
Dewey Robinson as The Colonel
Edgar Norton as Crotchett
Ethel Griffies as Lady McDougal
Claudia Craddock as Miss Snodgrass
James Burke as Mulroy
Jackie Searl as The Ship's Bad Boy

References

External links 
 

1933 films
American comedy films
1933 comedy films
Paramount Pictures films
Films directed by Norman Z. McLeod
American black-and-white films
1930s English-language films
1930s American films